Paavo Juhani Haavikko (January 25, 1931 in Helsinki – October 6, 2008) was a Finnish poet, playwright, essayist and publisher, considered one of the country's most outstanding writers. He published more than 70 works, and his poems have been translated to 12 languages.

Biography 
Paavo Haavikko was born and grew up in Helsinki. His father was a bookbinder and later worked in the import business. In 1951 Haavikko  graduated from the Kallio Coeducational School, and published his first collection of poems. 
 
In the 1950s Haavikko published several more poetry collections, culminating in the collection entitled Talvipalatsi ('The Winter Palace'; 1959). He was at the forefront of the emerging modernist movement in Finland, and in the following decades he had a profound influence on many other genres as well. As a result of his literary achievements, he became the leading writer of his generation and of the entire postwar period in Finland.

Haavikko's first wife Marja-Liisa Vartio was also a writer. They had two children. Marja-Liisa Vartio died in 1966, and Haavikko stopped writing for a long time.
Haavikko married Ritva Rainio in 1971. They lived separately since 1983.

Career as a writer 
Haavikko started his career as a poet, but he published in almost every genre of literature. His drama has seldom been played on traditional theatre scenes. Television series Rauta-aika illustrated freely the Finnish National epic Kalevala.  Operas Ratsumies (English title: The Horseman) and Kuningas lähtee Ranskaan (English title: The King goes forth to France) were composed by Aulis Sallinen  to librettos by Haavikko.

Haavikko placed many of his works in historical context but included references to more modern politics, such as Juho Kusti Paasikivi and Stalin in his play Agricola ja kettu ('Agricola and the Fox'), or Urho Kaleva Kekkonen as a Viking ruler. He scrutinized Finland's leading politicians and civil servants in his column in weekly magazine Suomen Kuvalehti.

Images occurring often in Haavikko's poetry included the king, palaces, gardens, and the woods.  Haavikko was talented in describing love, romantic and relationships between men and women. After the death of his first wife he started to write about subjects less discussed in poetry: economy, politics and  society.

Reception 
The high opinion of Haavikko's poetry was not confined to his home country: John Ashbery considered The Winter Palace as "one of the great poems of the century".

Business life 
From 1967 to 1983, Haavikko was literary director of the Otava publishing company, and from 1989 to his death owner of the Art House publishing company.

He and his family had a company producing peat for fuel. He also owned forest. When he died, his family inherited 3 million euros.

Honours
Aleksis Kivi Prize, Finnish Literature Society, 1966
Pro Finlandia Medal, 1967,
Honorary Doctorate from the University of Helsinki, 1969
Knight First Class of the White Rose of Finland, 1978
  Neustadt International Prize for Literature in 1984.
In 1993, he won the Swedish Academy Nordic Prize, known as the 'little Nobel'.
America Award, 2007

Works
Haavikko's  works represent many different literary genres, including the librettos for the  two operas. His career as is exceptional in its mere productivity: a book every eight months according to his own reckoning.

Poetry
 Tiet etäisyyksiin (1951) WSOY
 Tuuliöinä (1953) Otava
 Synnyinmaa (1955) Otava
 Lehdet lehtiä (1958) Otava
 Talvipalatsi (1959) Otava (The Winter Palace)
 Puut, kaikki heidän vihreytensä (1966) Otava
 Runoja matkalta salmen ylitse (1973) Otava
 Kaksikymmentä ja yksi (1974) Otava; English translation One and twenty (2007) Translated by Anselm Hollo. Beaverton: Aspasia Books. 
 Viiniä, kirjoitusta (1976) Otava. .
 Puolustuspuhe (1977) WSOY - poems and aforisms
 Viisi sarjaa nopeasti virtaavasta elämästä (1987) Art House
 Toukokuu, ikuinen (1988) Art House
 Rakkaudesta ja kuolemasta (1989) Art House
 Talvirunoja (1990)  Art House
 Puiden ylivertaisuudesta (1993) Art House
 Prosperon runot (2001) Art House

Poetry compilations
 Runot 1951–1961 (1962) Otava
 Runot 1949–1974 (1975) Otava
 Runoelmat (1975) Otava
 Sillat. Valitut runot (1984) Otava
 Runot! Runot 1984–1992 WSOY 1992
Includes After the Deadline (1984), Con amore, con furore (1985), Viisi sarjaa nopeasti virtaavasta elämästä (1987), Toukokuu, ikuinen (1988), Talvirunoja (1990), Musta herbaario (1992) and all the poems from aphorism books Pimeys (1984) and Kansalaisvapaudesta (1989). When After the Deadline and Con amore, con furore were first published, the author distributed them only to a small circle of friends. Musta herbaario was previously unpublished.
 Kirjainmerkit mustat. Runot 1949–1966 (1993) WSOY
 Tyrannin ylistys. Runot 1970–1981 (1994) WSOY
 Valitut runot (2006) WSOY

Plays
 Münchausen; Nuket: Kaksi näytelmää (1960) Otava
 Ylilääkäri: Kaksi näytelmää (1968)  Otava. Includes plays Ylilääkäri and Agricola ja kettu.
 Soitannollinen ilta Viipurissa 1918 (1978) Otava .
 Viisi pientä draamallista tekstiä (1981) Otava .
 Sulka: 12 näytelmää (1997) WSOY. .
Includes: Sulka (1973). Ratsumies (1974) (The Horseman), Kuningas lähtee Ranskaan (1974) (The King Goes Forth to France), Harald Pitkäikäinen (1974), Agricola ja kettu (1968), Kuningas Harald, jäähyväiset (radio play, 1978), Kaisa ja Otto (1976), Herra Östanskog (1981), Ne vahvimmat miehet ei ehjiksi jää (1976), Naismetsä (radio play, 1989), Englantilainen tarina (1990), Anastasia ja minä (1992) (Anastasya and I).
 Airo ja Brita  (1999) Art House .
 Hitlerin sateenvarjo (2004) WSOY .

Other prose
Kullervon tarina (1982) (Kullervo's Story)

Libretto
Paavo the Great. Great Race. Great Dream. (2000)
 Ratsumies (1974) (The Horseman)
 Kuningas lähtee Ranskaan (1974) (The King Goes Forth to France),

References

External links

 
Pekka Tarkka. "In memoriam Paavo Haavikko 1931–2008". Books from Finland. Retrieved 4 April 2019.

1931 births
2008 deaths
Writers from Helsinki
21st-century Finnish poets
Finnish dramatists and playwrights
Finnish male short story writers
Finnish short story writers
Finnish-language poets
Finnish-language writers
Finnish publishers (people)
20th-century Finnish poets
20th-century Finnish novelists
20th-century dramatists and playwrights
Finnish male poets
20th-century short story writers
21st-century short story writers
20th-century male writers
21st-century male writers
Recipients of the Eino Leino Prize